Uraš or Urash, in Sumerian religion, is a goddess of earth, and one of the consorts of the sky god Anu. She is the mother of the goddess Ninsun and a grandmother of the hero Gilgamesh.

However, Uras may only have been another name for Antum, Anu's wife. The name Uras even became applied to Anu himself, and acquired the meaning "heaven". Ninurta also was apparently called Uras in later times.

Urash is a distinct deity from the god Urash who was a minor farming deity known as the tutelary god of Dilbat and as the father of Nanaya.

See also 
Ki (goddess)

References

Michael Jordan, Encyclopedia of Gods, Kyle Cathie Limited, 2002

Mesopotamian goddesses
Earth goddesses